The Christa McAuliffe Fellowship Program (named after the deceased teacher and astronaut Christa McAuliffe), administered by the United States Department of Education from 1987 to 2002, provided annual fellowships to outstanding public and private elementary and secondary school teachers to continue their education, develop innovative programs, consult with or assist school districts or private school systems, or engage in other educational activities that will improve their knowledge and skills and the education of their students.

Christa McAuliffe Fellows were permitted to use awards for (1) sabbaticals for study or research associated with the objectives of the program or academic improvement, (2) consultation and assistance to local school systems, private schools, or private school systems, (3) development of special innovative programs, (4) projects or partnerships between schools and the business community, (5) programs that utilize new technologies to help students learn, and (6) expanding or replicating model programs of staff development. Recipients were required to return to a teaching position in their current school system for at least 2 years following the completion of their fellowships.

Past recipients
 Carolyn Coakley, 1987
 Terrance Franckowiak, 1988
 Donna Mason, 1988
 Michael McGuffee, 1988 
 Renise Marks 1988 [16]
 W. Dean Eastman, 1989 
 Carolyn Staudt, 1990 
 Marilee Sharon Frickey, 1991 
 Robert A. Morrey, 1991
 Sheri Lyn Sohm, 1992
 Richard W. Halsey, 1994
 Kathleen Mason, 1996
 Nancy Cartwright, 1998
 Robert Corbin, 1998
 Helen Schatz Comba 1998
 Kirsten Schmidt McCauley, IA, 1998
 Willene W. Agnew, 1999
 Gary Swick, 1999
 Teri Dary, 2000
Theresa Battlo Bales, WV, 2000

References

External links
Christa McAuliffe Fellowship Program

United States Department of Education
Scholarships in the United States